Willy Baumgärtner (23 December 1890 – 16 November 1953) was a German international footballer. At age 17 years and 104 days, he is the youngest ever player on the German national side. With his four matches for Germany, he was the record holder from 16 March 1909 to 24 April 1910.

References
 Kicker Fußball-Almanach 2011: Mit aktuellem Bundesliga-Spieler-ABC, Stiebner Verlag, 2010. pp 114.
 Uwe und die Auswanderer, DFB, 29 October 2011.

1890 births
1953 deaths
German footballers
BFC Germania 1888 players
Association football forwards
Germany international footballers
Footballers from Berlin